Ingersoll District Collegiate Institute (aka I.D.C.I.) is a public high school in Ingersoll, Ontario. As the only high school in Ingersoll, it also serves the village of Thamesford, and the rural areas surrounding both communities It is in the Thames Valley District School Board (TVDSB).  It is located in the north end of the town on Alma street. Historian and educator J.C. Herbert was a long-term principal of the school, where he has an award named after him.

Athletics
I.D.C.I. is involved in a variety of inter-school sports, including hockey, football, basketball, soccer, volleyball, track and field, curling, cross-country running, Nordic skiing and badminton.  Male and female athletes participate under the team name "Blue Bombers".

Clubs

I.D.C.I. also has numerous clubs available for all students.
 Adventure Club
 Archery Club
 Athletic Council
 Best Buddies
 Bomber Co-Pilots
 Breakfast Club
 Eco-Warriors
 Gay – Straight Alliance
 Healthy Schools Team
 Key Club
 Light & Sound Team
 Magic the Gathering Club
 Me 2 We
 Music Council
 Nordic Ski Club
 Project Linus
 Relay for Life
 Revolution
 Safe Schools Team
 Sci-Fi Club
 Skate Club (Icy Blues)
 Student Parliament
 United Way

Departments
 Art
 Business Studies
 Co-operative Education
 English
 Family Studies
 Geography
 Guidance
 History
 Library 
 Math
 Modern Languages
 Music/Drama
 Physical Education
 Science
 Special Education
 Technological Studies

Notable alumni
 Mark Hominick, MMA Fighter
 Jeremy Hansen, Astronaut
 Robert Budreau, Filmmaker

See also
List of high schools in Ontario

References

High schools in Oxford County, Ontario
Ingersoll, Ontario
Educational institutions established in 1932
1932 establishments in Ontario